Vladimir Ilyich Ulyanov ( 1870 – 21 January 1924), better known as Vladimir Lenin, was a Russian revolutionary, politician, and political theorist. He served as the first and founding head of government of Soviet Russia from 1917 to 1924 and of the Soviet Union from 1922 to 1924. Under his administration, Russia, and later the Soviet Union, became a one-party socialist state governed by the Communist Party. Ideologically a Marxist, his development of the ideology is known as Leninism.

Born to an upper-middle-class family in Simbirsk, Lenin embraced revolutionary socialist politics following his brother's 1887 execution. Expelled from Kazan Imperial University for participating in protests against the Russian Empire's Tsarist government, he devoted the following years to a law degree. He moved to Saint Petersburg in 1893 and became a senior Marxist activist. In 1897, he was arrested for sedition and exiled to Shushenskoye in Siberia for three years, where he married Nadezhda Krupskaya. After his exile, he moved to Western Europe, where he became a prominent theorist in the Marxist Russian Social Democratic Labour Party (RSDLP). In 1903, he took a key role in the RSDLP ideological split, leading the Bolshevik faction against Julius Martov's Mensheviks. Following Russia's failed Revolution of 1905, he campaigned for the First World War to be transformed into a Europe-wide proletarian revolution, which, as a Marxist, he believed would cause the overthrow of capitalism and its replacement with socialism. After the 1917 February Revolution ousted the Tsar and established a Provisional Government, he returned to Russia to play a leading role in the October Revolution in which the Bolsheviks overthrew the new regime.

Lenin's Bolshevik government initially shared power with the Left Socialist Revolutionaries, elected soviets, and a multi-party Constituent Assembly, although by 1918 it had centralised power in the new Communist Party. Lenin's administration redistributed land among the peasantry and nationalised banks and large-scale industry. It withdrew from the First World War by signing a treaty conceding territory to the Central Powers, and promoted world revolution through the Communist International. Opponents were suppressed in the Red Terror, a violent campaign administered by the state security services; tens of thousands were killed or interned in concentration camps. His administration defeated right and left-wing anti-Bolshevik armies in the Russian Civil War from 1917 to 1922 and oversaw the Polish–Soviet War of 1919–1921. Responding to wartime devastation, famine, and popular uprisings, in 1921 Lenin encouraged economic growth through the New Economic Policy. Several non-Russian nations had secured independence from the Russian Republic after 1917, but five were forcibly re-united into the new Soviet Union in 1922, while others repelled Soviet invasions. His health failing, Lenin died in Gorki, with Joseph Stalin succeeding him as the pre-eminent figure in the Soviet government.

Widely considered one of the most significant and influential figures of the 20th century, Lenin was the posthumous subject of a pervasive personality cult within the Soviet Union until its dissolution in 1991. He became an ideological figurehead behind Marxism–Leninism and a prominent influence over the international communist movement. A controversial and highly divisive historical figure, Lenin is viewed by his supporters as a champion of socialism and the working class. Meanwhile, Lenin's critics accuse him of establishing a totalitarian dictatorship which oversaw mass killings and political repression.

Early life

Childhood: 1870–1887

Going back to his great-grandparents, Russian, German, Swedish, Jewish and reportedly some distant Kalmyk ancestry has been discovered. His father Ilya Nikolayevich Ulyanov was from a family of former serfs; Ilya's father's ethnicity remains unclear, while Ilya's mother, Anna Alexeyevna Smirnova, was half-Kalmyk and half-Russian. Despite a lower-class background, Ilya had risen to middle-class status, studying physics and mathematics at Kazan University before teaching at the Penza Institute for the Nobility. Ilya married Maria Alexandrovna Blank in mid-1863. Well educated, she was the daughter of a wealthy German–Swedish Lutheran mother, and a Russian Jewish father who had converted to Christianity and worked as a physician. According to historian Petrovsky-Shtern, it is likely that Lenin was unaware of his mother's half-Jewish ancestry, which was only discovered by his sister Anna after his death. According to another version, Maria's father came from a family of German colonists invited to Russia by Catherine the Great.

Soon after their wedding, Ilya obtained a job in Nizhny Novgorod, rising to become Director of Primary Schools in the Simbirsk district six years later. Five years after that, he was promoted to Director of Public Schools for the province, overseeing the foundation of over 450 schools as a part of the government's plans for modernisation. In January 1882, his dedication to education earned him the Order of Saint Vladimir, which bestowed on him the status of hereditary nobleman.

Lenin was born in Streletskaya Ulitsa, Simbirsk, now Ulyanovsk, on 22 April 1870, and baptised six days later; as a child, he was known as Volodya, a diminutive of Vladimir. He was the third of eight children, having two older siblings, Anna (born 1864) and Alexander (born 1866). They were followed by three more children, Olga (born 1871), Dmitry (born 1874), and Maria (born 1878). Two later siblings died in infancy. Ilya was a devout member of the Russian Orthodox Church and baptised his children into it, although Maria, a Lutheran by upbringing, was largely indifferent to Christianity, a view that influenced her children.

Both of his parents were monarchists and liberal conservatives, being committed to the emancipation reform of 1861 introduced by the reformist Tsar Alexander II; they avoided political radicals and there is no evidence that the police ever put them under surveillance for subversive thought. Every summer they holidayed at a rural manor in Kokushkino. Among his siblings, Lenin was closest to his sister Olga, whom he often bossed around; he had an extremely competitive nature and could be destructive, but usually admitted his misbehaviour. A keen sportsman, he spent much of his free time outdoors or playing chess, and excelled at school, the disciplinarian and conservative Simbirsk Classical Gymnasium.

In January 1886, when Lenin was 15, his father died of a brain haemorrhage. Subsequently, his behaviour became erratic and confrontational and he renounced his belief in God. At the time, Lenin's elder brother Alexander, whom he affectionately knew as Sasha, was studying at Saint Petersburg University. Involved in political agitation against the absolute monarchy of the reactionary Tsar Alexander III, Alexander studied the writings of banned leftists and organised anti-government protests. He joined a revolutionary cell bent on assassinating the Tsar and was selected to construct a bomb. Before the attack could take place, the conspirators were arrested and tried, and Alexander was executed by hanging in May. Despite the emotional trauma of his father's and brother's deaths, Lenin continued studying, graduated from school at the top of his class with a gold medal for exceptional performance, and decided to study law at Kazan University.

University and political radicalisation: 1887–1893

Upon entering Kazan University in August 1887, Lenin moved into a nearby flat. There, he joined a zemlyachestvo, a form of university society that represented the men of a particular region. This group elected him as its representative to the university's zemlyachestvo council, and he took part in a December demonstration against government restrictions that banned student societies. The police arrested Lenin and accused him of being a ringleader in the demonstration; he was expelled from the university, and the Ministry of Internal Affairs exiled him to his family's Kokushkino estate. There, he read voraciously, becoming enamoured with Nikolay Chernyshevsky's 1863 pro-revolutionary novel What Is to Be Done?

Lenin's mother was concerned by her son's radicalisation, and was instrumental in convincing the Interior Ministry to allow him to return to the city of Kazan, but not the university. On his return, he joined Nikolai Fedoseev's revolutionary circle, through which he discovered Karl Marx's 1867 book Capital. This sparked his interest in Marxism, a socio-political theory that argued that society developed in stages, that this development resulted from class struggle, and that capitalist society would ultimately give way to socialist society and then communist society. Wary of his political views, Lenin's mother bought a country estate in Alakaevka village, Samara Oblast, in the hope that her son would turn his attention to agriculture. He had little interest in farm management, and his mother soon sold the land, keeping the house as a summer home.

In September 1889, the Ulyanov family moved to the city of Samara, where Lenin joined Alexei Sklyarenko's socialist discussion circle. There, Lenin fully embraced Marxism and produced a Russian language translation of Marx and Friedrich Engels's 1848 political pamphlet, The Communist Manifesto. He began to read the works of the Russian Marxist Georgi Plekhanov, agreeing with Plekhanov's argument that Russia was moving from feudalism to capitalism and so socialism would be implemented by the proletariat, or urban working class, rather than the peasantry. This Marxist perspective contrasted with the view of the agrarian-socialist Narodnik movement, which held that the peasantry could establish socialism in Russia by forming peasant communes, thereby bypassing capitalism. This Narodnik view developed in the 1860s with the People's Freedom Party and was then dominant within the Russian revolutionary movement. Lenin rejected the premise of the agrarian-socialist argument, but was influenced by agrarian-socialists like Pyotr Tkachev and Sergei Nechaev, and befriended several Narodniks.

In May 1890, Maria, who retained societal influence as the widow of a nobleman, persuaded the authorities to allow Lenin to take his exams externally at the University of St Petersburg, where he obtained the equivalent of a first-class degree with honours. The graduation celebrations were marred when his sister Olga died of typhoid. Lenin remained in Samara for several years, working first as a legal assistant for a regional court and then for a local lawyer. He devoted much time to radical politics, remaining active in Sklyarenko's group and formulating ideas about how Marxism applied to Russia. Inspired by Plekhanov's work, Lenin collected data on Russian society, using it to support a Marxist interpretation of societal development and counter the claims of the Narodniks. He wrote a paper on peasant economics; it was rejected by the liberal journal Russian Thought.

Revolutionary activity

Early activism and imprisonment: 1893–1900

In late 1893, Lenin moved to Saint Petersburg. There, he worked as a barrister's assistant and rose to a senior position in a Marxist revolutionary cell that called itself the Social-Democrats after the Marxist Social Democratic Party of Germany. Publicly championing Marxism within the socialist movement, he encouraged the founding of revolutionary cells in Russia's industrial centres. By late 1894, he was leading a Marxist workers' circle, and meticulously covered his tracks, knowing that police spies tried to infiltrate the movement. He began a romantic relationship with Nadezhda "Nadya" Krupskaya, a Marxist schoolteacher. He also authored the political tract What the "Friends of the People" Are and How They Fight the Social-Democrats criticising the Narodnik agrarian-socialists, based largely on his experiences in Samara; around 200 copies were illegally printed in 1894.

Lenin hoped to cement connections between his Social-Democrats and Emancipation of Labour, a group of Russian Marxist émigrés based in Switzerland; he visited the country to meet group members Plekhanov and Pavel Axelrod. He proceeded to Paris to meet Marx's son-in-law Paul Lafargue and to research the Paris Commune of 1871, which he considered an early prototype for a proletarian government. Financed by his mother, he stayed in a Swiss health spa before travelling to Berlin, where he studied for six weeks at the Staatsbibliothek and met the Marxist activist Wilhelm Liebknecht. Returning to Russia with a stash of illegal revolutionary publications, he travelled to various cities distributing literature to striking workers. While involved in producing a news sheet, Rabochee delo (Workers' Cause), he was among 40 activists arrested in St. Petersburg and charged with sedition.

Refused legal representation or bail, Lenin denied all charges against him but remained imprisoned for a year before sentencing. He spent this time theorising and writing. In this work he noted that the rise of industrial capitalism in Russia had caused large numbers of peasants to move to the cities, where they formed a proletariat. From his Marxist perspective, Lenin argued that this Russian proletariat would develop class consciousness, which would in turn lead them to violently overthrow tsarism, the aristocracy, and the bourgeoisie and to establish a proletariat state that would move toward socialism.

In February 1897, Lenin was sentenced without trial to three years' exile in eastern Siberia. He was granted a few days in Saint Petersburg to put his affairs in order and used this time to meet with the Social-Democrats, who had renamed themselves the League of Struggle for the Emancipation of the Working Class. His journey to eastern Siberia took 11 weeks, for much of which he was accompanied by his mother and sisters. Deemed only a minor threat to the government, he was exiled to a peasant's hut in Shushenskoye, Minusinsky District, where he was kept under police surveillance; he was nevertheless able to correspond with other revolutionaries, many of whom visited him, and permitted to go on trips to swim in the Yenisei River and to hunt duck and snipe.

In May 1898, Nadya joined him in exile, having been arrested in August 1896 for organising a strike. She was initially posted to Ufa, but persuaded the authorities to move her to Shushenskoye, claiming that she and Lenin were engaged; they married in a church on 10 July 1898. Settling into a family life with Nadya's mother Elizaveta Vasilyevna, in Shushenskoye the couple translated English socialist literature into Russian. Keen to keep up with developments in German Marxism, where there had been an ideological split, with revisionists like Eduard Bernstein advocating a peaceful, electoral path to socialism, Lenin remained devoted to violent revolution, attacking revisionist arguments in A Protest by Russian Social-Democrats. He also finished The Development of Capitalism in Russia (1899), his longest book to date, which criticised the agrarian-socialists and promoted a Marxist analysis of Russian economic development. Published under the pseudonym of Vladimir Ilin, upon publication it received predominantly poor reviews.

Munich, London, and Geneva: 1900–1905

After his exile, Lenin settled in Pskov in early 1900. There, he began raising funds for a newspaper, Iskra (Spark), a new organ of the Russian Marxist party, now calling itself the Russian Social Democratic Labour Party (RSDLP). In July 1900, Lenin left Russia for Western Europe; in Switzerland he met other Russian Marxists, and at a Corsier conference they agreed to launch the paper from Munich, where Lenin relocated in September. Containing contributions from prominent European Marxists, Iskra was smuggled into Russia, becoming the country's most successful underground publication for 50 years. He first adopted the pseudonym Lenin in December 1901, possibly based on the Siberian River Lena; he often used the fuller pseudonym of N. Lenin, and while the N did not stand for anything, a popular misconception later arose that it represented Nikolai. Under this pseudonym, he published the political pamphlet What Is to Be Done? in 1902; his most influential publication to date, it dealt with Lenin's thoughts on the need for a vanguard party to lead the proletariat to revolution.

His wife Nadya joined Lenin in Munich and became his personal secretary. They continued their political agitation, as Lenin wrote for Iskra and drafted the RSDLP programme, attacking ideological dissenters and external critics, particularly the Socialist Revolutionary Party (SR), a Narodnik agrarian-socialist group founded in 1901. Despite remaining a Marxist, he accepted the Narodnik view on the revolutionary power of the Russian peasantry, accordingly penning the 1903 pamphlet To the Village Poor. To evade Bavarian police, Lenin moved to London with Iskra in April 1902. He became friends with fellow Russian-Ukrainian Marxist Leon Trotsky. Lenin fell ill with erysipelas and was unable to take such a leading role on the Iskra editorial board; in his absence, the board moved its base of operations to Geneva.

The second RSDLP Congress was held in London in July 1903. At the conference, a schism emerged between Lenin's supporters and those of Julius Martov. Martov argued that party members should be able to express themselves independently of the party leadership; Lenin disagreed, emphasising the need for a strong leadership with complete control over the party. Lenin's supporters were in the majority, and he termed them the "majoritarians" (bol'sheviki in Russian; Bolsheviks); in response, Martov termed his followers the "minoritarians" (men'sheviki in Russian; Mensheviks). Arguments between Bolsheviks and Mensheviks continued after the conference; the Bolsheviks accused their rivals of being opportunists and reformists who lacked discipline, while the Mensheviks accused Lenin of being a despot and autocrat. Enraged at the Mensheviks, Lenin resigned from the Iskra editorial board and in May 1904 published the anti-Menshevik tract One Step Forward, Two Steps Back. The stress made Lenin ill, and to recuperate he went on a hiking holiday in rural Switzerland. The Bolshevik faction grew in strength; by spring 1905, the whole RSDLP Central Committee was Bolshevik, and in December they founded the newspaper Vpered (Forward).

Revolution of 1905 and its aftermath: 1905–1914

In January 1905, the Bloody Sunday massacre of protesters in St. Petersburg sparked a spate of civil unrest in the Russian Empire known as the Revolution of 1905. Lenin urged Bolsheviks to take a greater role in the events, encouraging violent insurrection. In doing so, he adopted SR slogans regarding "armed insurrection", "mass terror", and "the expropriation of gentry land", resulting in Menshevik accusations that he had deviated from orthodox Marxism. In turn, he insisted that the Bolsheviks split completely with the Mensheviks; many Bolsheviks refused, and both groups attended the Third RSDLP Congress, held in London in April 1905 at the Brotherhood Church. Lenin presented many of his ideas in the pamphlet Two Tactics of Social Democracy in the Democratic Revolution, published in August 1905. Here, he predicted that Russia's liberal bourgeoisie would be sated by a transition to constitutional monarchy and thus betray the revolution; instead he argued that the proletariat would have to build an alliance with the peasantry to overthrow the Tsarist regime and establish the "provisional revolutionary democratic dictatorship of the proletariat and the peasantry."

In response to the revolution of 1905, which had failed to overthrow the government, Tsar Nicholas II accepted a series of liberal reforms in his October Manifesto. In this climate, Lenin felt it safe to return to St. Petersburg. Joining the editorial board of Novaya Zhizn (New Life), a radical legal newspaper run by Maria Andreyeva, he used it to discuss issues facing the RSDLP. He encouraged the party to seek out a much wider membership, and advocated the continual escalation of violent confrontation, believing both to be necessary for a successful revolution. Recognising that membership fees and donations from a few wealthy sympathisers were insufficient to finance the Bolsheviks' activities, Lenin endorsed the idea of robbing post offices, railway stations, trains, and banks. Under the lead of Leonid Krasin, a group of Bolsheviks began carrying out such criminal actions, the best known taking place in June 1907, when a group of Bolsheviks acting under the leadership of Joseph Stalin committed an armed robbery of the State Bank in Tiflis, Georgia.

Although he briefly supported the idea of reconciliation between Bolsheviks and Mensheviks, Lenin's advocacy of violence and robbery was condemned by the Mensheviks at the Fourth RSDLP Congress, held in Stockholm in April 1906. Lenin was involved in setting up a Bolshevik Centre in Kuokkala, Grand Duchy of Finland, which was at the time a semi-autonomous part of the Russian Empire, before the Bolsheviks regained dominance of the RSDLP at its Fifth Congress, held in London in May 1907. As the Tsarist government cracked down on opposition, both by disbanding Russia's legislative assembly, the Second Duma, and by ordering its secret police, the Okhrana, to arrest revolutionaries, Lenin fled Finland for Switzerland. There, he tried to exchange those banknotes stolen in Tiflis that had identifiable serial numbers on them.

Alexander Bogdanov and other prominent Bolsheviks decided to relocate the Bolshevik Centre to Paris; although Lenin disagreed, he moved to the city in December 1908. Lenin disliked Paris, lambasting it as "a foul hole", and while there he sued a motorist who knocked him off his bike. Lenin became very critical of Bogdanov's view that Russia's proletariat had to develop a socialist culture in order to become a successful revolutionary vehicle. Instead, Lenin favoured a vanguard of socialist intelligentsia who would lead the working-classes in revolution. Furthermore, Bogdanov, influenced by Ernest Mach, believed that all concepts of the world were relative, whereas Lenin stuck to the orthodox Marxist view that there was an objective reality independent of human observation. Bogdanov and Lenin holidayed together at Maxim Gorky's villa in Capri in April 1908; on returning to Paris, Lenin encouraged a split within the Bolshevik faction between his and Bogdanov's followers, accusing the latter of deviating from Marxism.

In May 1908, Lenin lived briefly in London, where he used the British Museum Reading Room to write Materialism and Empirio-criticism, an attack on what he described as the "bourgeois-reactionary falsehood" of Bogdanov's relativism. Lenin's factionalism began to alienate increasing numbers of Bolsheviks, including his former close supporters Alexei Rykov and Lev Kamenev. The Okhrana exploited his factionalist attitude by sending a spy, Roman Malinovsky, to act as a vocal Lenin supporter within the party. Various Bolsheviks expressed their suspicions about Malinovsky to Lenin, although it is unclear if the latter was aware of the spy's duplicity; it is possible that he used Malinovsky to feed false information to the Okhrana.

In August 1910, Lenin attended the Eighth Congress of the Second International, an international meeting of socialists, in Copenhagen as the RSDLP's representative, following this with a holiday in Stockholm with his mother. With his wife and sisters he then moved to France, settling first in Bombon and then Paris. Here, he became a close friend to the French Bolshevik Inessa Armand; some biographers suggest that they had an extra-marital affair from 1910 to 1912. Meanwhile, at a Paris meeting in June 1911, the RSDLP Central Committee decided to move their focus of operations back to Russia, ordering the closure of the Bolshevik Centre and its newspaper, Proletari. Seeking to rebuild his influence in the party, Lenin arranged for a party conference to be held in Prague in January 1912, and although 16 of the 18 attendants were Bolsheviks, he was heavily criticised for his factionalist tendencies and failed to boost his status within the party.

Moving to Kraków in the Kingdom of Galicia and Lodomeria, a culturally Polish part of the Austro-Hungarian Empire, he used Jagiellonian University's library to conduct research. He stayed in close contact with the RSDLP, which was operating in the Russian Empire, convincing the Duma's Bolshevik members to split from their parliamentary alliance with the Mensheviks. In January 1913, Stalin, whom Lenin referred to as the "wonderful Georgian", visited him, and they discussed the future of non-Russian ethnic groups in the Empire. Due to the ailing health of both Lenin and his wife, they moved to the rural town of Biały Dunajec, before heading to Bern for Nadya to have surgery on her goitre.

First World War: 1914–1917

Lenin was in Galicia when the First World War broke out. The war pitted the Russian Empire against the Austro-Hungarian Empire, and due to his Russian citizenship, Lenin was arrested and briefly imprisoned until his anti-Tsarist credentials were explained. Lenin and his wife returned to Bern, before relocating to Zürich in February 1916. Lenin was angry that the German Social-Democratic Party was supporting the German war effort, which was a direct contravention of the Second International's Stuttgart resolution that socialist parties would oppose the conflict, and saw the Second International as defunct. He attended the Zimmerwald Conference in September 1915 and the Kienthal Conference in April 1916, urging socialists across the continent to convert the "imperialist war" into a continent-wide "civil war" with the proletariat pitted against the bourgeoisie and aristocracy. In July 1916, Lenin's mother died, but he was unable to attend her funeral. Her death deeply affected him, and he became depressed, fearing that he too would die before seeing the proletarian revolution.

In September 1917, Lenin published Imperialism, the Highest Stage of Capitalism, which argued that imperialism was a product of monopoly capitalism, as capitalists sought to increase their profits by extending into new territories where wages were lower and raw materials cheaper. He believed that competition and conflict would increase and that war between the imperialist powers would continue until they were overthrown by proletariat revolution and socialism established. He spent much of this time reading the works of Georg Wilhelm Friedrich Hegel, Ludwig Feuerbach, and Aristotle, all of whom had been key influences on Marx. This changed Lenin's interpretation of Marxism; whereas he once believed that policies could be developed based on predetermined scientific principles, he concluded that the only test of whether a policy was correct was its practice. He still perceived himself as an orthodox Marxist, but he began to diverge from some of Marx's predictions about societal development; whereas Marx had believed that a "bourgeoisie-democratic revolution" of the middle-classes had to take place before a "socialist revolution" of the proletariat, Lenin believed that in Russia the proletariat could overthrow the Tsarist regime without an intermediate revolution.

February Revolution and the July Days: 1917

In February 1917, the February Revolution broke out in St. Petersburg, renamed Petrograd at the beginning of the First World War, as industrial workers went on strike over food shortages and deteriorating factory conditions. The unrest spread to other parts of Russia, and fearing that he would be violently overthrown, Tsar Nicholas II abdicated. The State Duma took over control of the country, establishing the Russian Provisional Government and converting the Empire into a new Russian Republic. When Lenin learned of this from his base in Switzerland, he celebrated with other dissidents. He decided to return to Russia to take charge of the Bolsheviks but found that most passages into the country were blocked due to the ongoing conflict. He organised a plan with other dissidents to negotiate a passage for them through Germany, with which Russia was then at war. Recognising that these dissidents could cause problems for their Russian enemies, the German government agreed to permit 32 Russian citizens to travel by train through their territory, among them Lenin and his wife. For political reasons, Lenin and the Germans agreed to a cover story that Lenin had travelled by sealed train carriage through German territory, but in fact the train was not truly sealed, and the passengers were allowed to disembark to, for example, spend the night in Frankfurt. The group travelled by train from Zürich to Sassnitz, proceeding by ferry to Trelleborg, Sweden, and from there to the Haparanda–Tornio border crossing and then to Helsinki before taking the final train to Petrograd in disguise.

Arriving at Petrograd's Finland Station in April, Lenin gave a speech to Bolshevik supporters condemning the Provisional Government and again calling for a continent-wide European proletarian revolution. Over the following days, he spoke at Bolshevik meetings, lambasting those who wanted reconciliation with the Mensheviks and revealing his "April Theses", an outline of his plans for the Bolsheviks, which he had written on the journey from Switzerland. He publicly condemned both the Mensheviks and the Social Revolutionaries, who dominated the influential Petrograd Soviet, for supporting the Provisional Government, denouncing them as traitors to socialism. Considering the government to be just as imperialist as the Tsarist regime, he advocated immediate peace with Germany and Austria-Hungary, rule by soviets, the nationalisation of industry and banks, and the state expropriation of land, all with the intention of establishing a proletariat government and pushing toward a socialist society. By contrast, the Mensheviks believed that Russia was insufficiently developed to transition to socialism, and accused Lenin of trying to plunge the new Republic into civil war. Over the coming months Lenin campaigned for his policies, attending the meetings of the Bolshevik Central Committee, prolifically writing for the Bolshevik newspaper Pravda, and giving public speeches in Petrograd aimed at converting workers, soldiers, sailors, and peasants to his cause.

Sensing growing frustration among Bolshevik supporters, Lenin suggested an armed political demonstration in Petrograd to test the government's response. Amid deteriorating health, he left the city to recuperate in the Finnish village of Neivola. The Bolsheviks' armed demonstration, the July Days, took place while Lenin was away, but upon learning that demonstrators had violently clashed with government forces, he returned to Petrograd and called for calm. Responding to the violence, the government ordered the arrest of Lenin and other prominent Bolsheviks, raiding their offices, and publicly alleging that he was a German agent provocateur. Evading arrest, Lenin hid in a series of Petrograd safe houses. Fearing that he would be killed, Lenin and fellow senior Bolshevik Grigory Zinoviev escaped Petrograd in disguise, relocating to Razliv. There, Lenin began work on the book that became The State and Revolution, an exposition on how he believed the socialist state would develop after the proletariat revolution, and how from then on the state would gradually wither away, leaving a pure communist society. He began arguing for a Bolshevik-led armed insurrection to topple the government, but at a clandestine meeting of the party's central committee this idea was rejected. Lenin then headed by train and by foot to Finland, arriving at Helsinki on 10 August, where he hid away in safe houses belonging to Bolshevik sympathisers.

October Revolution: 1917

In August 1917, while Lenin was in Finland, General Lavr Kornilov, the Commander-in-Chief of the Russian Army, sent troops to Petrograd in what appeared to be a military coup attempt against the Provisional Government. Premier Alexander Kerensky turned to the Petrograd Soviet, including its Bolshevik members, for help, allowing the revolutionaries to organise workers as Red Guards to defend the city. The coup petered out before it reached Petrograd, but the events had allowed the Bolsheviks to return to the open political arena. Fearing a counter-revolution from right-wing forces hostile to socialism, the Mensheviks and Socialist-Revolutionaries who dominated the Petrograd Soviet had been instrumental in pressuring the government to normalise relations with the Bolsheviks. Both the Mensheviks and Socialist-Revolutionaries had lost much popular support because of their affiliation with the Provisional Government and its unpopular continuation of the war. The Bolsheviks capitalised on this, and soon the pro-Bolshevik Marxist Trotsky was elected leader of the Petrograd Soviet. In September, the Bolsheviks gained a majority in the workers' sections of both the Moscow and Petrograd Soviets.

Recognising that the situation was safer for him, Lenin returned to Petrograd. There he attended a meeting of the Bolshevik Central Committee on 10 October, where he again argued that the party should lead an armed insurrection to topple the Provisional Government. This time the argument won with ten votes against two. Critics of the plan, Zinoviev and Kamenev, argued that Russian workers would not support a violent coup against the regime and that there was no clear evidence for Lenin's assertion that all of Europe was on the verge of proletarian revolution. The party began plans to organise the offensive, holding a final meeting at the Smolny Institute on 24 October. This was the base of the Military Revolutionary Committee (MRC), an armed militia largely loyal to the Bolsheviks that had been established by the Petrograd Soviet during Kornilov's alleged coup.

In October, the MRC was ordered to take control of Petrograd's key transport, communication, printing and utilities hubs, and did so without bloodshed. Bolsheviks besieged the government in the Winter Palace, and overcame it and arrested its ministers after the cruiser Aurora, controlled by Bolshevik seamen, fired a blank shot to signal the start of the revolution. During the insurrection, Lenin gave a speech to the Petrograd Soviet announcing that the Provisional Government had been overthrown. The Bolsheviks declared the formation of a new government, the Council of People's Commissars, or Sovnarkom. Lenin initially turned down the leading position of Chairman, suggesting Trotsky for the job, but other Bolsheviks insisted and ultimately Lenin relented. Lenin and other Bolsheviks then attended the Second Congress of Soviets on 26 and 27 October, and announced the creation of the new government. Menshevik attendees condemned the illegitimate seizure of power and the risk of civil war. In these early days of the new regime, Lenin avoided talking in Marxist and socialist terms so as not to alienate Russia's population, and instead spoke about having a country controlled by the workers. Lenin and many other Bolsheviks expected proletariat revolution to sweep across Europe in days or months.

Lenin's government

Organising the Soviet government: 1917–1918
The Provisional Government had planned for a Constituent Assembly to be elected in November 1917; against Lenin's objections, Sovnarkom agreed for the vote to take place as scheduled. In the constitutional election, the Bolsheviks gained approximately a quarter of the vote, being defeated by the agrarian-focused Socialist-Revolutionaries. Lenin argued that the election was not a fair reflection of the people's will, that the electorate had not had time to learn the Bolsheviks' political programme, and that the candidacy lists had been drawn up before the Left Socialist-Revolutionaries split from the Socialist-Revolutionaries. Nevertheless, the newly elected Russian Constituent Assembly convened in Petrograd in January 1918. Sovnarkom argued that it was counter-revolutionary because it sought to remove power from the soviets, but the Socialist-Revolutionaries and Mensheviks denied this. The Bolsheviks presented the Assembly with a motion that would strip it of most of its legal powers; when the Assembly rejected the motion, Sovnarkom declared this as evidence of its counter-revolutionary nature and forcibly disbanded it.

Lenin rejected repeated calls, including from some Bolsheviks, to establish a coalition government with other socialist parties. Although refusing a coalition with the Mensheviks or Socialist-Revolutionaries, Sovnarkom partially relented; they allowed the Left Socialist-Revolutionaries five posts in the cabinet in December 1917. This coalition only lasted four months until March 1918, when the Left Socialist-Revolutionaries pulled out of the government over a disagreement about the Bolsheviks' approach to ending the First World War. At their 7th Congress in March 1918, the Bolsheviks changed their official name from the Russian Social Democratic Labour Party to the Russian Communist Party, as Lenin wanted to both distance his group from the increasingly reformist German Social Democratic Party and to emphasise its ultimate goal, that of a communist society.

Although ultimate power officially rested with the country's government in the form of Sovnarkom and the Executive Committee (VTSIK) elected by the All-Russian Congress of Soviets (ARCS), the Communist Party was de facto in control in Russia, as acknowledged by its members at the time. By 1918, Sovnarkom began acting unilaterally, claiming a need for expediency, with the ARCS and VTSIK becoming increasingly marginalised, so the soviets no longer had a role in governing Russia. During 1918 and 1919, the government expelled Mensheviks and Socialist-Revolutionaries from the soviets. Russia had become a one-party state.

Within the party was established a Political Bureau (Politburo) and Organisation Bureau (Orgburo) to accompany the existing Central Committee; the decisions of these party bodies had to be adopted by Sovnarkom and the Council of Labour and Defence. Lenin was the most significant figure in this governance structure as well as being the Chairman of Sovnarkom and sitting on the Council of Labour and Defence, and on the Central Committee and Politburo of the Communist Party. The only individual to have anywhere near this influence was Lenin's right-hand man, Yakov Sverdlov, who died in March 1919 during a flu pandemic. In November 1917, Lenin and his wife took a two-room flat within the Smolny Institute; the following month they left for a brief holiday in Halila, Finland. In January 1918, he survived an assassination attempt in Petrograd; Fritz Platten, who was with Lenin at the time, shielded him and was injured by a bullet.

Concerned that the German Army posed a threat to Petrograd, in March 1918 Sovnarkom relocated to Moscow, initially as a temporary measure. There, Lenin, Trotsky, and other Bolshevik leaders moved into the Kremlin, where Lenin lived with his wife and sister Maria in a first floor apartment adjacent to the room in which the Sovnarkom meetings were held. Lenin disliked Moscow, but rarely left the city centre during the rest of his life. He survived a second assassination attempt, in Moscow in August 1918; he was shot following a public speech and injured badly. A Socialist-Revolutionary, Fanny Kaplan, was arrested and executed. The attack was widely covered in the Russian press, generating much sympathy for Lenin and boosting his popularity. As a respite, he was driven in September 1918 to the luxurious Gorki estate, just outside Moscow, recently nationalized for him by the government.

Social, legal, and economic reform: 1917–1918

Upon taking power, Lenin's regime issued a series of decrees. The first was a Decree on Land, which declared that the landed estates of the aristocracy and the Orthodox Church should be nationalised and redistributed to peasants by local governments. This contrasted with Lenin's desire for agricultural collectivisation but provided governmental recognition of the widespread peasant land seizures that had already occurred. In November 1917, the government issued the Decree on the Press that closed many opposition media outlets deemed counter-revolutionary. They claimed the measure would be temporary; the decree was widely criticised, including by many Bolsheviks, for compromising freedom of the press.

In November 1917, Lenin issued the Declaration of the Rights of the Peoples of Russia, which stated that non-Russian ethnic groups living inside the Republic had the right to secede from Russian authority and establish their own independent nation-states. Many nations declared independence (Finland and Lithuania in December 1917, Latvia and Ukraine in January 1918, Estonia in February 1918, Transcaucasia in April 1918, and Poland in November 1918). Soon, the Bolsheviks actively promoted communist parties in these independent nation-states, while at the Fifth All-Russian Congress of the Soviets in July 1918 a constitution was approved that reformed the Russian Republic into the Russian Soviet Federative Socialist Republic. Seeking to modernise the country, the government officially converted Russia from the Julian calendar to the Gregorian calendar used in Europe.

In November 1917, Sovnarkom issued a decree abolishing Russia's legal system, calling on the use of "revolutionary conscience" to replace the abolished laws. The courts were replaced by a two-tier system, namely the Revolutionary Tribunals to deal with counter-revolutionary crimes, and the People's Courts to deal with civil and other criminal offences. They were instructed to ignore pre-existing laws, and base their rulings on the Sovnarkom decrees and a "socialist sense of justice." November also saw an overhaul of the armed forces; Sovnarkom implemented egalitarian measures, abolished previous ranks, titles, and medals, and called on soldiers to establish committees to elect their commanders.

In October 1917, Lenin issued a decree limiting work for everyone in Russia to eight hours per day. He also issued the Decree on Popular Education that stipulated that the government would guarantee free, secular education for all children in Russia, and a decree establishing a system of state orphanages. To combat mass illiteracy, a literacy campaign was initiated; an estimated 5 million people enrolled in crash courses of basic literacy from 1920 to 1926. Embracing the equality of the sexes, laws were introduced that helped to emancipate women, by giving them economic autonomy from their husbands and removing restrictions on divorce. Zhenotdel, a Bolshevik women's organisation, was established to further these aims.  Under Lenin, Russia became the first country to legalize abortion on demand in the first trimester. Militantly atheist, Lenin and the Communist Party wanted to demolish organised religion. In January 1918, the government decreed the separation of church and state, and prohibited religious instruction in schools.

In November 1917, Lenin issued the Decree on Workers' Control, which called on the workers of each enterprise to establish an elected committee to monitor their enterprise's management. That month they also issued an order requisitioning the country's gold, and nationalised the banks, which Lenin saw as a major step toward socialism. In December, Sovnarkom established a Supreme Council of the National Economy (VSNKh), which had authority over industry, banking, agriculture, and trade. The factory committees were subordinate to the trade unions, which were subordinate to VSNKh; the state's centralised economic plan was prioritised over the workers' local economic interests. In early 1918, Sovnarkom cancelled all foreign debts and refused to pay interest owed on them. In April 1918, it nationalised foreign trade, establishing a state monopoly on imports and exports. In June 1918, it decreed nationalisation of public utilities, railways, engineering, textiles, metallurgy, and mining, although often these were state-owned in name only. Full-scale nationalisation did not take place until November 1920, when small-scale industrial enterprises were brought under state control.

A faction of the Bolsheviks known as the "Left Communists" criticised Sovnarkom's economic policy as too moderate; they wanted nationalisation of all industry, agriculture, trade, finance, transport, and communication. Lenin believed that this was impractical at that stage and that the government should only nationalise Russia's large-scale capitalist enterprises, such as the banks, railways, larger landed estates, and larger factories and mines, allowing smaller businesses to operate privately until they grew large enough to be successfully nationalised. Lenin also disagreed with the Left Communists about the economic organisation; in June 1918, he argued that centralised economic control of industry was needed, whereas Left Communists wanted each factory to be controlled by its workers, a syndicalist approach that Lenin considered detrimental to the cause of socialism.

Adopting a left-libertarian perspective, both the Left Communists and other factions in the Communist Party critiqued the decline of democratic institutions in Russia. Internationally, many socialists decried Lenin's regime and denied that he was establishing socialism; in particular, they highlighted the lack of widespread political participation, popular consultation, and industrial democracy. In late 1918, the Czech-Austrian Marxist Karl Kautsky authored an anti-Leninist pamphlet condemning the anti-democratic nature of Soviet Russia, to which Lenin published a vociferous reply. German Marxist Rosa Luxemburg echoed Kautsky's views, while Russian anarchist Peter Kropotkin described the Bolshevik seizure of power as "the burial of the Russian Revolution."

Treaty of Brest-Litovsk: 1917–1918

Upon taking power, Lenin believed that a key policy of his government must be to withdraw from the First World War by establishing an armistice with the Central Powers of Germany and Austria-Hungary. He believed that ongoing war would create resentment among war-weary Russian troops, to whom he had promised peace, and that these troops and the advancing German Army threatened both his own government and the cause of international socialism. By contrast, other Bolsheviks, in particular Nikolai Bukharin and the Left Communists, believed that peace with the Central Powers would be a betrayal of international socialism and that Russia should instead wage "a war of revolutionary defence" that would provoke an uprising of the German proletariat against their own government.

Lenin proposed a three-month armistice in his Decree on Peace of November 1917, which was approved by the Second Congress of Soviets and presented to the German and Austro-Hungarian governments. The Germans responded positively, viewing this as an opportunity to focus on the Western Front and stave off looming defeat. In November, armistice talks began at Brest-Litovsk, the headquarters of the German high command on the Eastern Front, with the Russian delegation being led by Trotsky and Adolph Joffe. Meanwhile, a ceasefire until January was agreed. During negotiations, the Germans insisted on keeping their wartime conquests, which included Poland, Lithuania, and Courland, whereas the Russians countered that this was a violation of these nations' rights to self-determination. Some Bolsheviks had expressed hopes of dragging out negotiations until proletarian revolution broke out throughout Europe. On 7 January 1918, Trotsky returned from Brest-Litovsk to St. Petersburg with an ultimatum from the Central Powers: either Russia accept Germany's territorial demands or the war would resume.

In January and again in February, Lenin urged the Bolsheviks to accept Germany's proposals. He argued that the territorial losses were acceptable if it ensured the survival of the Bolshevik-led government. The majority of Bolsheviks rejected his position, hoping to prolong the armistice and call Germany's bluff. On 18 February, the German Army launched Operation Faustschlag, advancing further into Russian-controlled territory and conquering Dvinsk within a day. At this point, Lenin finally convinced a small majority of the Bolshevik Central Committee to accept the Central Powers' demands. On 23 February, the Central Powers issued a new ultimatum: Russia had to recognise German control not only of Poland and the Baltic states but also of Ukraine, or face a full-scale invasion.

On 3 March, the Treaty of Brest-Litovsk was signed. It resulted in massive territorial losses for Russia, with 26% of the former Empire's population, 37% of its agricultural harvest area, 28% of its industry, 26% of its railway tracks, and three-quarters of its coal and iron deposits being transferred to German control. Accordingly, the Treaty was deeply unpopular across Russia's political spectrum, and several Bolsheviks and Left Socialist-Revolutionaries resigned from Sovnarkom in protest. After the Treaty, Sovnarkom focused on trying to foment proletarian revolution in Germany, issuing an array of anti-war and anti-government publications in the country; the German government retaliated by expelling Russia's diplomats. The Treaty nevertheless failed to stop the Central Powers' defeat; in November 1918, the German Emperor Wilhelm II abdicated and the country's new administration signed the Armistice with the Allies. As a result, Sovnarkom proclaimed the Treaty of Brest-Litovsk void.

Anti-Kulak campaigns, Cheka, and Red Terror: 1918–1922

By early 1918, many cities in western Russia faced famine as a result of chronic food shortages. Lenin blamed this on the kulaks, or wealthier peasants, who allegedly hoarded the grain that they had produced to increase its financial value. In May 1918, he issued a requisitioning order that established armed detachments to confiscate grain from kulaks for distribution in the cities, and in June called for the formation of Committees of Poor Peasants to aid in requisitioning. This policy resulted in vast social disorder and violence, as armed detachments often clashed with peasant groups, helping to set the stage for the civil war. A prominent example of Lenin's views was his August 1918 telegram to the Bolsheviks of Penza, which called upon them to suppress a peasant insurrection by publicly hanging at least 100 "known kulaks, rich men, [and] bloodsuckers."

The requisitions disincentivised peasants from producing more grain than they could personally consume, and thus production slumped. A booming black market supplemented the official state-sanctioned economy, and Lenin called on speculators, black marketeers and looters to be shot. Both the Socialist-Revolutionaries and Left Socialist-Revolutionaries condemned the armed appropriations of grain at the Fifth All-Russian Congress of Soviets in July 1918. Realising that the Committees of the Poor Peasants were also persecuting peasants who were not kulaks and thus contributing to anti-government feeling among the peasantry, in December 1918 Lenin abolished them.

Lenin repeatedly emphasised the need for terror and violence in overthrowing the old order and ensuring the success of the revolution. Speaking to the All-Russian Central Executive Committee of the Soviets in November 1917, he declared that "the state is an institution built up for the sake of exercising violence. Previously, this violence was exercised by a handful of moneybags over the entire people; now we want [...] to organise violence in the interests of the people." He strongly opposed suggestions to abolish capital punishment. Fearing anti-Bolshevik forces would overthrow his administration, in December 1917 Lenin ordered the establishment of the Emergency Commission for Combating Counter-Revolution and Sabotage, or Cheka, a political police force led by Felix Dzerzhinsky.

In September 1918, Sovnarkom passed a decree that inaugurated the Red Terror, a system of repression orchestrated by the Cheka. Although sometimes described as an attempt to eliminate the entire bourgeoisie, Lenin did not want to exterminate all members of this class, merely those who sought to reinstate their rule. The majority of the Terror's victims were well-to-do citizens or former members of the Tsarist administration; others were non-bourgeois anti-Bolsheviks and perceived social undesirables such as prostitutes. The Cheka claimed the right to both sentence and execute anyone whom it deemed to be an enemy of the government, without recourse to the Revolutionary Tribunals. Accordingly, throughout Soviet Russia the Cheka carried out killings, often in large numbers. For example, the Petrograd Cheka executed 512 people in a few days. There are no surviving records to provide an accurate figure of how many perished in the Red Terror; later estimates of historians have ranged between 10,000 and 15,000, and 50,000 to 140,000.

Lenin never witnessed this violence or participated in it first-hand, and publicly distanced himself from it. His published articles and speeches rarely called for executions, but he regularly did so in his coded telegrams and confidential notes. Many Bolsheviks expressed disapproval of the Cheka's mass executions and feared the organisation's apparent unaccountability. The Communist Party tried to restrain its activities in February 1919, stripping it of its powers of tribunal and execution in those areas not under official martial law, but the Cheka continued as before in swathes of the country. By 1920, the Cheka had become the most powerful institution in Soviet Russia, exerting influence over all other state apparatus.

A decree in April 1919 resulted in the establishment of concentration camps, which were entrusted to the Cheka, later administered by a new government agency, Gulag. By the end of 1920, 84 camps had been established across Soviet Russia, holding about 50,000 prisoners; by October 1923, this had grown to 315 camps and about 70,000 inmates. Those interned in the camps were used as slave labour. From July 1922, intellectuals deemed to be opposing the Bolshevik government were exiled to inhospitable regions or deported from Russia altogether; Lenin personally scrutinised the lists of those to be dealt with in this manner. In May 1922, Lenin issued a decree calling for the execution of anti-Bolshevik priests, causing between 14,000 and 20,000 deaths. The Russian Orthodox Church was worst affected; the government's anti-religious policies also impacted on Roman Catholic and Protestant churches, Jewish synagogues, and Islamic mosques.

Civil War and the Polish–Soviet War: 1918–1920

Lenin expected Russia's aristocracy and bourgeoisie to oppose his government, but he believed that the numerical superiority of the lower classes, coupled with the Bolsheviks' ability to effectively organise them, guaranteed a swift victory in any conflict. In this, he failed to anticipate the intensity of the violent opposition to Bolshevik rule in Russia. The ensuing Russian Civil War pitted the pro-Bolshevik Reds against the anti-Bolshevik Whites but also encompassed ethnic conflicts on Russia's borders and conflict between both Red and White armies and local peasant groups, the Green armies, throughout the former Empire. Accordingly, various historians have seen the civil war as representing two distinct conflicts: one between the revolutionaries and the counter-revolutionaries, and the other between different revolutionary factions.

The White armies were established by former Tsarist military officers, and included Anton Denikin's Volunteer Army in South Russia, Alexander Kolchak's forces in Siberia, and Nikolai Yudenich's troops in the newly independent Baltic states. The Whites were bolstered when 35,000 members of the Czech Legion, who were prisoners of war from the conflict with the Central Powers, turned against Sovnarkom and allied with the Committee of Members of the Constituent Assembly (Komuch), an anti-Bolshevik government established in Samara. The Whites were also backed by Western governments who perceived the Treaty of Brest-Litovsk as a betrayal of the Allied war effort and feared the Bolsheviks' calls for world revolution. In 1918, Great Britain, France, United States, Canada, Italy, and Serbia landed 10,000 troops in Murmansk, seizing Kandalaksha, while later that year British, American, and Japanese forces landed in Vladivostok. Western troops soon pulled out of the civil war, instead only supporting the Whites with officers, technicians and armaments, but Japan remained because they saw the conflict as an opportunity for territorial expansion.

Lenin tasked Trotsky with establishing a Workers' and Peasants' Red Army, and with his support, Trotsky organised a Revolutionary Military Council in September 1918, remaining its chairman until 1925. Recognising their valuable military experience, Lenin agreed that officers from the old Tsarist army could serve in the Red Army, although Trotsky established military councils to monitor their activities. The Reds held control of Russia's two largest cities, Moscow and Petrograd, as well as most of Great Russia, while the Whites were located largely on the former Empire's peripheries. The latter were therefore hindered by being both fragmented and geographically scattered, and because their ethnic Russian supremacism alienated the region's national minorities. Anti-Bolshevik armies carried out the White Terror, a campaign of violence against perceived Bolshevik supporters which was typically more spontaneous than the state-sanctioned Red Terror. Both White and Red Armies were responsible for attacks against Jewish communities, prompting Lenin to issue a condemnation of anti-Semitism, blaming prejudice against Jews on capitalist propaganda.

In July 1918, Sverdlov informed Sovnarkom that the Ural Regional Soviet had overseen the execution of the former Tsar and his immediate family in Yekaterinburg to prevent them from being rescued by advancing White troops. Although lacking proof, biographers and historians like Richard Pipes and Dmitri Volkogonov have expressed the view that the killing was probably sanctioned by Lenin; conversely, historian James Ryan cautioned that there was "no reason" to believe this. Whether Lenin sanctioned it or not, he still regarded it as necessary, highlighting the precedent set by the execution of Louis XVI in the French Revolution.

After the Brest-Litovsk Treaty, the Left Socialist-Revolutionaries had abandoned the coalition and increasingly viewed the Bolsheviks as traitors to the revolution. In July 1918, the Left Socialist-Revolutionary Yakov Blumkin assassinated the German ambassador to Russia, Wilhelm von Mirbach, hoping that the ensuing diplomatic incident would lead to a relaunched revolutionary war against Germany. The Left Socialist-Revolutionaries then launched a coup in Moscow, shelling the Kremlin and seizing the city's central post office before being stopped by Trotsky's forces. The party's leaders and many members were arrested and imprisoned, but were treated more leniently than other opponents of the Bolsheviks.

By 1919, the White armies were in retreat and by the start of 1920 were defeated on all three fronts. Although Sovnarkom were victorious, the territorial extent of the Russian state had been reduced, for many non-Russian ethnic groups had used the disarray to push for national independence. In some cases, such as the north-eastern European nations of Estonia, Latvia, Lithuania, and Finland, the Soviets recognised their independence and concluded peace treaties. In other cases, the Red Army suppressed secessionist movements; by 1921 they had defeated the Ukrainian national movements and occupied the Caucasus, although fighting in Central Asia lasted until the late 1920s.

After the German Ober Ost garrisons were withdrawn from the Eastern Front following the Armistice, both Soviet Russian armies and Polish ones moved in to fill the vacuum. The newly independent Polish state and the Soviet government each sought territorial expansion in the region. Polish and Russian troops first clashed in February 1919, with the conflict developing into the Polish–Soviet War. Unlike the Soviets' previous conflicts, this had greater implications for the export of revolution and the future of Europe. Polish forces pushed into Ukraine and by May 1920 had taken Kiev from the Soviets. After forcing the Polish Army back, Lenin urged the Red Army to invade Poland itself, believing that the Polish proletariat would rise up to support the Russian troops and thus spark European revolution. Trotsky and other Bolsheviks were sceptical, but agreed to the invasion. The Polish proletariat did not rise, and the Red Army was defeated at the Battle of Warsaw. The Polish armies pushed the Red Army back into Russia, forcing Sovnarkom to sue for peace; the war culminated in the Peace of Riga, in which Russia ceded territory to Poland.

Comintern and world revolution: 1919–1920

After the Armistice on the Western Front, Lenin believed that the breakout of the European revolution was imminent. Seeking to promote this, Sovnarkom supported the establishment of Béla Kun's soviet government in Hungary in March 1919, followed by the soviet government in Bavaria and various revolutionary socialist uprisings in other parts of Germany, including that of the Spartacus League. During Russia's Civil War, the Red Army was sent into the newly independent national republics on Russia's borders to aid Marxists there in establishing soviet systems of government. In Europe, this resulted in the creation of new communist-led states in Estonia, Latvia, Lithuania, Belarus, and Ukraine, all of which were officially independent of Russia, while further east it led to the creation of communist governments in Outer Mongolia. Various senior Bolsheviks wanted these absorbed into the Russian state; Lenin insisted that national sensibilities should be respected, but reassured his comrades that these nations' new Communist Party administrations were under the de facto authority of Sovnarkom.

In late 1918, the British Labour Party called for the establishment of an international conference of socialist parties, the Labour and Socialist International. Lenin saw this as a revival of the Second International, which he had despised, and formulated his own rival international socialist conference to offset its impact. Organised with the aid of Zinoviev, Nikolai Bukharin, Trotsky, Christian Rakovsky, and Angelica Balabanoff, the First Congress of this Communist International (Comintern) opened in Moscow in March 1919. It lacked global coverage; of the 34 assembled delegates, 30 resided within the countries of the former Russian Empire, and most of the international delegates were not recognised by any socialist parties in their own nations. Accordingly, the Bolsheviks dominated proceedings, with Lenin subsequently authoring a series of regulations that meant that only socialist parties endorsing the Bolsheviks' views were permitted to join Comintern. During the first conference, Lenin spoke to the delegates, lambasting the parliamentary path to socialism espoused by revisionist Marxists like Kautsky and repeating his calls for a violent overthrow of Europe's bourgeoisie governments. While Zinoviev became Comintern's president, Lenin retained significant influence over it.

The Second Congress of the Communist International opened in Petrograd's Smolny Institute in July 1920, representing the last time that Lenin visited a city other than Moscow. There, he encouraged foreign delegates to emulate the Bolsheviks' seizure of power and abandoned his longstanding viewpoint that capitalism was a necessary stage in societal development, instead, encouraging those nations under colonial occupation to transform their pre-capitalist societies directly into socialist ones. For this conference, he authored "Left-Wing" Communism: An Infantile Disorder, a short book articulating his criticism of elements within the British and German communist parties who refused to enter their nations' parliamentary systems and trade unions; instead he urged them to do so to advance the revolutionary cause. The conference had to be suspended for several days due to the ongoing war with Poland, and was relocated to Moscow, where it continued to hold sessions until August. Lenin's predicted world revolution did not materialise, as the Hungarian communist government was overthrown and the German Marxist uprisings suppressed.

Famine and the New Economic Policy: 1920–1922

Within the Communist Party, there was dissent from two factions, the Group of Democratic Centralism and the Workers' Opposition, both of which accused the Russian state of being too centralised and bureaucratic. The Workers' Opposition, which had connections to the official state trade unions, also expressed the concern that the government had lost the trust of the Russian working class. They were angered by Trotsky's suggestion that the trade unions be eliminated. He deemed the unions to be superfluous in a "workers' state", but Lenin disagreed, believing it best to retain them; most Bolsheviks embraced Lenin's view in the 'trade union discussion'. To deal with the dissent, at the Tenth Party Congress in February 1921, Lenin introduced a ban on factional activity within the party, under pain of expulsion.

Caused in part by a drought, the Russian famine of 1921–22 was the most severe that the country had experienced since the year 1603, resulting in around five million deaths, the most of any famine in Russian history. The famine was exacerbated by government requisitioning, as well as the export of large quantities of Russian grain. To aid the famine victims, the US government established an American Relief Administration to distribute food; Lenin was suspicious of this aid and had it closely monitored. During the famine, Patriarch Tikhon called on Orthodox churches to sell unnecessary items to help feed the starving, an action endorsed by the government. In February 1922 Sovnarkom went further by calling on all valuables belonging to religious institutions to be forcibly appropriated and sold. Tikhon opposed the sale of items used within the Eucharist and many clergy resisted the appropriations, resulting in violence.

In 1920 and 1921, local opposition to requisitioning resulted in anti-Bolshevik peasant uprisings breaking out across Russia, which were suppressed. Among the most significant was the Tambov Rebellion, which was put down by the Red Army. In February 1921, workers went on strike in Petrograd, resulting in the government proclaiming martial law in the city and sending in the Red Army to quell demonstrations. In March, the Kronstadt rebellion began when sailors in Kronstadt revolted against the Bolshevik government, demanding that all socialists be allowed to publish freely, that independent trade unions be given freedom of assembly and that peasants be allowed free markets and not be subject to requisitioning. Lenin declared that the mutineers had been misled by the Socialist-Revolutionaries and foreign imperialists, calling for violent reprisals. Under Trotsky's leadership, the Red Army put down the rebellion on 17 March, resulting in thousands of deaths and the internment of survivors in labour camps.

In February 1921, Lenin introduced a New Economic Policy (NEP) to the Politburo; he convinced most senior Bolsheviks of its necessity and it passed into law in April. Lenin explained the policy in a booklet, On the Food Tax, in which he stated that the NEP represented a return to the original Bolshevik economic plans; he claimed that these had been derailed by the civil war, in which Sovnarkom had been forced to resort to the economic policies of war communism. The NEP allowed some private enterprise within Russia, permitting the reintroduction of the wage system and allowing peasants to sell produce on the open market while being taxed on their earnings. The policy also allowed for a return to privately owned small industry; basic industry, transport and foreign trade remained under state control. Lenin termed this "state capitalism", and many Bolsheviks thought it to be a betrayal of socialist principles. Lenin biographers have often characterised the introduction of the NEP as one of his most significant achievements and some believe that had it not been implemented then Sovnarkom would have been quickly overthrown by popular uprisings.

In January 1920, the government brought in universal labour conscription, ensuring that all citizens aged between 16 and 50 had to work. Lenin also called for a mass electrification project, the GOELRO plan, which began in February 1920; Lenin's declaration that "communism is Soviet power plus the electrification of the whole country" was widely cited in later years. Seeking to advance the Russian economy through foreign trade, Sovnarkom sent delegates to the Genoa Conference; Lenin had hoped to attend but was prevented by ill health. The conference resulted in a Russian agreement with Germany, which followed on from an earlier trade agreement with the United Kingdom. Lenin hoped that by allowing foreign corporations to invest in Russia, Sovnarkom would exacerbate rivalries between the capitalist nations and hasten their downfall; he tried to rent the oil fields of Kamchatka to an American corporation to heighten tensions between the US and Japan, who desired Kamchatka for their empire.

Declining health and conflict with Stalin: 1920–1923

To Lenin's embarrassment and horror, in April 1920 the Bolsheviks held a party to celebrate his fiftieth birthday, which was also marked by widespread celebrations across Russia and the publication of poems and biographies dedicated to him. Between 1920 and 1926, twenty volumes of Lenin's Collected Works were published; some material was omitted. During 1920, several prominent Western figures visited Lenin in Russia; these included the author H. G. Wells and the philosopher Bertrand Russell, as well as the anarchists Emma Goldman and Alexander Berkman. Lenin was also visited at the Kremlin by Armand, who was in increasingly poor health. He sent her to a sanatorium in Kislovodsk in the Northern Caucasus to recover, but she died there in September 1920 during a cholera epidemic. Her body was transported to Moscow, where a visibly grief-stricken Lenin oversaw her burial beneath the Kremlin Wall.

Lenin was seriously ill by the latter half of 1921, experiencing hyperacusis, insomnia, and regular headaches. At the Politburo's insistence, in July he left Moscow for a month's leave at his Gorki mansion, where he was cared for by his wife and sister. Lenin began to contemplate the possibility of suicide, asking both Krupskaya and Stalin to acquire potassium cyanide for him. Twenty-six physicians were hired to help Lenin during his final years; many of them were foreign and had been hired at great expense. Some suggested that his sickness could have been caused by metal oxidation from the bullets that were lodged in his body from the 1918 assassination attempt; in April 1922 he underwent a surgical operation to remove them. The symptoms continued after this, with Lenin's doctors unsure of the cause; some suggested that he had neurasthenia or cerebral arteriosclerosis. In May 1922, he had his first stroke, temporarily losing his ability to speak and being paralysed on his right side. He convalesced at Gorki, and had largely recovered by July. In October, he returned to Moscow; in December, he had a second stroke and returned to Gorki.

Despite his illness, Lenin remained keenly interested in political developments. When the Socialist Revolutionary Party's leadership was found guilty of conspiring against the government in a trial held between June and August 1922, Lenin called for their execution; they were instead imprisoned indefinitely, only being executed during the Great Purge of Stalin's leadership. With Lenin's support, the government also succeeded in virtually eradicating Menshevism in Russia by expelling all Mensheviks from state institutions and enterprises in March 1923 and then imprisoning the party's membership in concentration camps. Lenin was concerned by the survival of the Tsarist bureaucratic system in Soviet Russia, particularly during his final years. Condemning bureaucratic attitudes, he suggested a total overhaul to deal with such problems, in one letter complaining that "we are being sucked into a foul bureaucratic swamp".

In October 1922, Lenin proposed that Trotsky should become first deputy chairman of the Council of People's Commissars at a meeting of the Central Committee, but Trotsky declined the position. This has been interpreted as evidence that Lenin designated Trotsky as a successor as head of government.  During December 1922 and January 1923, Lenin dictated "Lenin's Testament", in which he discussed the personal qualities of his comrades, particularly Trotsky and Stalin. He recommended that Stalin be removed from the position of General Secretary of the Communist Party, deeming him ill-suited for the position. Instead he recommended Trotsky for the job, describing him as "the most capable man in the present Central Committee"; he highlighted Trotsky's superior intellect but at the same time criticised his self-assurance and inclination toward excess administration. During this period he dictated a criticism of the bureaucratic nature of the Workers' and Peasants' Inspectorate, calling for the recruitment of new, working-class staff as an antidote to this problem, while in another article he called for the state to combat illiteracy, promote punctuality and conscientiousness within the populace, and encourage peasants to join co‑operatives.

In Lenin's absence, Stalin had begun consolidating his power both by appointing his supporters to prominent positions, and by cultivating an image of himself as Lenin's closest intimate and deserving successor. In December 1922, Stalin took responsibility for Lenin's regimen, being tasked by the Politburo with controlling who had access to him. Lenin was increasingly critical of Stalin; while Lenin was insisting that the state should retain its monopoly on international trade during mid-1922, Stalin was leading other Bolsheviks in unsuccessfully opposing this. There were personal arguments between the two as well; Stalin had upset Krupskaya by shouting at her during a phone conversation, which in turn greatly angered Lenin, who sent Stalin a letter expressing his annoyance.

The most significant political division between the two emerged during the Georgian Affair. Stalin had suggested that both the forcibly Sovietized Georgia and neighbouring countries like Azerbaijan and Armenia, which were all invaded and occupied by the Red Army, should be merged into the Russian state, despite the protestations of their local Soviet-installed governments. Lenin saw this as an expression of Great Russian ethnic chauvinism by Stalin and his supporters, instead calling for these nation-states to join Russia as semi-independent parts of a greater union, which he suggested be called the Union of Soviet Republics of Europe and Asia. After some resistance to the proposal, Stalin eventually accepted it but, with Lenin's agreement, he changed the name of the newly proposed state to the Union of Soviet Socialist Republics (USSR). Lenin sent Trotsky to speak on his behalf at a Central Committee plenum in December, where the plans for the USSR were sanctioned; these plans were then ratified on 30 December by the Congress of Soviets, resulting in the formation of the Soviet Union. Despite his poor health, Lenin was elected chairman of the new government of the Soviet Union.

Death and funeral: 1923–1924

In March 1923, Lenin had a third stroke and lost his ability to speak; that month, he experienced partial paralysis on his right side and began exhibiting sensory aphasia. By May, he appeared to be making a slow recovery, regaining some of his mobility, speech, and writing skills. In October, he made a final visit to the Kremlin. In his final weeks, Lenin was visited by Zinoviev, Kamenev, and Bukharin; the latter visited him at his Gorki mansion on the day of his death. On 21 January 1924, Lenin fell into a coma and died later that day. His official cause of death was recorded as an incurable disease of the blood vessels.

The Soviet government publicly announced Lenin's death the following day. On 23 January, mourners from the Communist Party, trade unions, and Soviets visited his Gorki home to inspect the body, which was carried aloft in a red coffin by leading Bolsheviks. Transported by train to Moscow, the coffin was taken to the House of Trade Unions, where the body lay in state.
Over the next three days, around a million mourners came to see the body, many queuing for hours in the freezing conditions. On 26 January, the eleventh All-Union Congress of Soviets met to pay respects, with speeches by Kalinin, Zinoviev, and Stalin. Notably, Trotsky was absent; he had been convalescing in the Caucasus, and he later claimed that Stalin sent him a telegram with the incorrect date of the planned funeral, making it impossible for him to arrive in time. Lenin's funeral took place the following day, when his body was carried to Red Square, accompanied by martial music, where assembled crowds listened to a series of speeches before the corpse was placed into the vault of a specially erected mausoleum. Despite the freezing temperatures, tens of thousands attended.

Against Krupskaya's protestations, Lenin's body was embalmed to preserve it for long-term public display in the Red Square mausoleum. During this process, Lenin's brain was removed; in 1925 an institute was established to dissect it, revealing that Lenin had had severe sclerosis. In July 1929, the Politburo agreed to replace the temporary mausoleum with a permanent one in granite, which was finished in 1933. His sarcophagus was replaced in 1940 and again in 1970. For safety amid the Second World War, from 1941 to 1945 the body was temporarily moved to Tyumen. As of 2022, his body remains on public display in Lenin's Mausoleum on Red Square.

Political ideology

Marxism and Leninism

Lenin was a devout Marxist, and believed that his interpretation of Marxism, first termed "Leninism" by Martov in 1904, was the sole authentic and orthodox one. According to his Marxist perspective, humanity would eventually reach pure communism, becoming a stateless, classless, egalitarian society of workers who were free from exploitation and alienation, controlled their own destiny, and abided by the rule "from each according to his ability, to each according to his needs." According to Volkogonov, Lenin "deeply and sincerely" believed that the path he was setting Russia on would ultimately lead to the establishment of this communist society.

Lenin's Marxist beliefs led him to the view that society could not transform directly from its present state to communism, but must first enter a period of socialism, and so his main concern was how to convert Russia into a socialist society. To do so, he believed that a "dictatorship of the proletariat" was necessary to suppress the bourgeoisie and develop a socialist economy. He defined socialism as "an order of civilized co-operators in which the means of production are socially owned", and believed that this economic system had to be expanded until it could create a society of abundance. To achieve this, he saw bringing the Russian economy under state control to be his central concern, with "all citizens" becoming "hired employees of the state" in his words. Lenin's interpretation of socialism was centralised, planned, and statist, with both production and distribution strictly controlled. He believed that all workers throughout the country would voluntarily join to enable the state's economic and political centralisation. In this way, his calls for "workers' control" of the means of production referred not to the direct control of enterprises by their workers, but the operation of all enterprises under the control of a "workers' state." This resulted in what some perceive as two conflicting themes within Lenin's thought: popular workers' control, and a centralised, hierarchical, coercive state apparatus.

Before 1914, Lenin's views were largely in accordance with mainstream European Marxist orthodoxy. Although he derided Marxists who adopted ideas from contemporary non-Marxist philosophers and sociologists, his own ideas were influenced not only by Russian Marxist theory but also by wider ideas from the Russian revolutionary movement, including those of the Narodnik agrarian-socialists. He adapted his ideas according to changing circumstances, including the pragmatic realities of governing Russia amid war, famine, and economic collapse. As Leninism developed, Lenin revised the established Marxist orthodoxy and introduced innovations in Marxist thought.

In his theoretical writings, particularly Imperialism, the Highest Stage of Capitalism, Lenin discussed what he regarded as developments in capitalism since Marx's death; in his view, it had reached the new stage of state monopoly capitalism. He believed that although Russia's economy was dominated by the peasantry, the presence of monopoly capitalism in Russia meant that the country was sufficiently materially developed to move to socialism. Leninism adopted a more absolutist and doctrinaire perspective than other variants of Marxism, and distinguished itself by the emotional intensity of its liberationist vision. It also stood out by emphasising the role of a vanguard who could lead the proletariat to revolution, and elevated the role of violence as a revolutionary instrument. Bertrand Russell, on his meeting with Lenin in 1920, said: "[He (Lenin) was possessed with] absolute orthodoxy. He thought a proposition could be proved by quoting a text in Marx. And he was quite incapable of supposing that there could be anything in Marx that wasn't right."

Democracy and the national question

Lenin believed that the representative democracy of capitalist countries gave the illusion of democracy while maintaining the "dictatorship of the bourgeoisie"; describing the representative democratic system of the United States, he referred to the "spectacular and meaningless duels between two bourgeois parties", both of whom were led by "astute multimillionaires" that exploited the American proletariat. He opposed liberalism, exhibiting a general antipathy toward liberty as a value, and believing that liberalism's freedoms were fraudulent because it did not free labourers from capitalist exploitation.

Lenin declared that "Soviet government is many millions of times more democratic than the most democratic-bourgeois republic", the latter of which was simply "a democracy for the rich." He regarded his "dictatorship of the proletariat" as democratic because, he claimed, it involved the election of representatives to the soviets, workers electing their own officials, and the regular rotation and involvement of all workers in the administration of the state. Lenin's belief as to what a proletariat state should look like nevertheless deviated from that adopted by the Marxist mainstream; European Marxists like Kautsky envisioned a democratically elected parliamentary government in which the proletariat had a majority, whereas Lenin called for a strong, centralised state apparatus that excluded any input from the bourgeois.

Lenin was an internationalist and a keen supporter of world revolution, deeming national borders to be an outdated concept and nationalism a distraction from class struggle. He believed that in a socialist society, the world's nations would inevitably merge and result in a single world government. He believed that this socialist state would need to be a centralised, unitary one, and regarded federalism as a bourgeois concept. In his writings, Lenin espoused anti-imperialist ideas and stated that all nations deserved "the right of self-determination." He supported wars of national liberation, accepting that such conflicts might be necessary for a minority group to break away from a socialist state, because socialist states are not "holy or insured against mistakes or weaknesses."

Prior to taking power in 1917, he was concerned that ethnic and national minorities would make the Soviet state ungovernable with their calls for independence; according to the historian Simon Sebag Montefiore, Lenin thus encouraged Stalin to develop "a theory that offered the ideal of autonomy and the right of secession without necessarily having to grant either." On taking power, Lenin called for the dismantling of the bonds that had forced minority ethnic groups to remain in the Russian Empire and espoused their right to secede but also expected them to reunite immediately in the spirit of proletariat internationalism. He was willing to use military force to ensure this unity, resulting in armed incursions into the independent states that formed in Ukraine, Georgia, Poland, Finland, and the Baltic states. Only when its conflicts with Finland, the Baltic states, and Poland proved unsuccessful did Lenin's government officially recognise their independence.

Personal life and characteristics

Lenin saw himself as a man of destiny and firmly believed in the righteousness of his cause and his own ability as a revolutionary leader. Biographer Louis Fischer described him as "a lover of radical change and maximum upheaval", a man for whom "there was never a middle-ground. He was an either-or, black-or-red exaggerator". Highlighting Lenin's "extraordinary capacity for disciplined work" and "devotion to the revolutionary cause", Pipes noted that he exhibited much charisma. Similarly, Volkogonov believed that "by the very force of his personality, [Lenin] had an influence over people". Conversely, Lenin's friend Gorky commented that in his physical appearance as a "baldheaded, stocky, sturdy person", the communist revolutionary was "too ordinary" and did not give "the impression of being a leader".

Historian and biographer Robert Service asserted that Lenin had been an intensely emotional young man, who exhibited strong hatred for the Tsarist authorities. According to Service, Lenin developed an "emotional attachment" to his ideological heroes, such as Marx, Engels, and Chernyshevsky; he owned portraits of them, and privately described himself as being "in love" with Marx and Engels. According to Lenin biographer James D. White, Lenin treated their writings as "holy writ", a "religious dogma", which should "not be questioned but believed in". In Volkogonov's view, Lenin accepted Marxism as "absolute truth", and accordingly acted like "a religious fanatic". Similarly, Bertrand Russell felt that Lenin exhibited "unwavering faith—religious faith in the Marxian gospel". Biographer Christopher Read suggested that Lenin was "a secular equivalent of theocratic leaders who derive their legitimacy from the [perceived] truth of their doctrines, not popular mandates". Lenin was nevertheless an atheist and a critic of religion, believing that socialism was inherently atheistic; he thus considered Christian socialism a contradiction in terms.

Service stated that Lenin could be "moody and volatile", and Pipes deemed him to be "a thoroughgoing misanthrope", a view rejected by Read, who highlighted many instances in which Lenin displayed kindness, particularly toward children. According to several biographers, Lenin was intolerant of opposition and often dismissed outright opinions that differed from his own. He could be "venomous in his critique of others", exhibiting a propensity for mockery, ridicule, and ad hominem attacks on those who disagreed with him. He ignored facts that did not suit his argument, abhorred compromise, and very rarely admitted his own errors. He refused to change his opinions, until he rejected them completely, after which he would treat the new view as if it was just as unchangeable. Lenin showed no sign of sadism or of personally desiring to commit violent acts, but he endorsed the violent actions of others and exhibited no remorse for those killed for the revolutionary cause. Adopting a utilitarian stance, in Lenin's view the end always justified the means; according to Service, Lenin's "criterion of morality was simple: does a certain action advance or hinder the cause of the Revolution?"

Ethnically, Lenin identified as Russian. Service described Lenin as "a bit of a snob in national, social and cultural terms". The Bolshevik leader believed that other European countries, especially Germany, were culturally superior to Russia, describing the latter as "one of the most benighted, medieval and shamefully backward of Asian countries". He was annoyed at what he perceived as a lack of conscientiousness and discipline among the Russian people, and from his youth had wanted Russia to become more culturally European and Western.

Despite his revolutionary politics, Lenin disliked revolutionary experimentation in literature and the arts, expressing his dislike of expressionism, futurism, and cubism, and conversely favouring realism and Russian classic literature. Lenin also had a conservative attitude towards sex and marriage. Throughout his adult life, he was in a relationship with Krupskaya, a fellow Marxist whom he married. Lenin and Krupskaya both regretted that they never had children, and they enjoyed entertaining their friends' offspring. Read noted that Lenin had "very close, warm, lifelong relationships" with his close family members; he had no lifelong friends, and Armand has been cited as being his only close, intimate confidante.

Aside from Russian, Lenin spoke and read French, German, and English. Concerned with physical fitness, he exercised regularly, enjoyed cycling, swimming, and hunting, and also developed a passion for mountain walking in the Swiss peaks. He was also fond of pets, in particular cats. Tending to eschew luxury, he lived a spartan lifestyle, and Pipes noted that Lenin was "exceedingly modest in his personal wants", leading "an austere, almost ascetic, style of life." Lenin despised untidiness, always keeping his work desk tidy and his pencils sharpened, and insisted on total silence while he was working. According to Fischer, Lenin's "vanity was minimal", and for this reason he disliked the cult of personality that the Soviet administration began to build around him; he nevertheless accepted that it might have some benefits in unifying the communist movement.

Legacy

Volkogonov said, while renouncing Leninist ideology, that "there can scarcely have been another man in history who managed so profoundly to change so large a society on such a scale." Lenin's administration laid the framework for the system of government that ruled Russia for seven decades and provided the model for later Communist-led states that came to cover a third of the inhabited world in the mid-20th century. As a result, Lenin's influence was global. A controversial figure, Lenin remains both reviled and revered, a figure who has been both idolised and demonised. Even during his lifetime, Lenin "was loved and hated, admired and scorned" by the Russian people. This has extended into academic studies of Lenin and Leninism, which have often been polarised along political lines.

The historian Albert Resis suggested that if the October Revolution is considered the most significant event of the 20th century, then Lenin "must for good or ill be considered the century's most significant political leader." White described Lenin as "one of the undeniably outstanding figures of modern history", while Service noted that the Russian leader was widely understood to be one of the 20th century's "principal actors." Read considered him "one of the most widespread, universally recognizable icons of the twentieth century", while Ryan called him "one of the most significant and influential figures of modern history." Time magazine named Lenin one of the 100 most important people of the 20th century, and one of their top 25 political icons of all time.

In the Western world, biographers began writing about Lenin soon after his death; some such as Christopher Hill were sympathetic to him, and others such as Richard Pipes and Robert Gellately expressly hostile. Some later biographers such as Read and Lars Lih sought to avoid making either hostile or positive comments about him, thereby evading politicised stereotypes. Among sympathisers, he was portrayed as having made a genuine adjustment of Marxist theory that enabled it to suit Russia's particular socio-economic conditions. The Soviet view characterised him as a man who recognised the historically inevitable and accordingly helped to make the inevitable happen. Conversely, the majority of Western historians have perceived him as a person who manipulated events in order to attain and then retain political power, moreover considering his ideas as attempts to ideologically justify his pragmatic policies. Later, revisionists in both Russia and the West highlighted the impact that pre-existing ideas and popular pressures exerted on Lenin and his policies.

Various historians and biographers have characterised Lenin's administration as totalitarian, and as a police state, and many have described it as a one-party dictatorship. Several such scholars have described Lenin as a dictator; Ryan stated that he was "not a dictator in the sense that all his recommendations were accepted and implemented", for many of his colleagues disagreed with him on various issues. Fischer noted that while "Lenin was a dictator, [he was] not the kind of dictator Stalin later became." Volkogonov believed that whereas Lenin established a "dictatorship of the Party", it would only be under Stalin that the Soviet Union became the "dictatorship of one man."

Conversely, various Marxist observers, including Western historians Hill and John Rees, argued against the view that Lenin's government was a dictatorship, viewing it instead as an imperfect way of preserving elements of democracy without some of the processes found in liberal democratic states. Ryan contends that the leftist historian Paul Le Blanc "makes a quite valid point that the personal qualities that led Lenin to brutal policies were not necessarily any stronger than in some of the major Western leaders of the twentieth century." Ryan also posits that for Lenin revolutionary violence was merely a means to an end, namely the establishment of a socialist, ultimately communist world—a world without violence. Historian J. Arch Getty remarked, "Lenin deserves a lot of credit for the notion that the meek can inherit the earth, that there can be a political movement based on social justice and equality." Some left-wing intellectuals, among them Slavoj Žižek, Alain Badiou, Lars T. Lih, and Fredric Jameson, advocate reviving Lenin's uncompromising revolutionary spirit to address contemporary global problems.

Within the Soviet Union

In the Soviet Union, a cult of personality devoted to Lenin began to develop during his lifetime, but was only fully established after his death. According to historian Nina Tumarkin, it represented the world's "most elaborate cult of a revolutionary leader" since that of George Washington in the United States, and has been repeatedly described as "quasi-religious" in nature. Busts or statues of Lenin were erected in almost every village, and his face adorned postage stamps, crockery, posters, and the front pages of Soviet newspapers Pravda and Izvestia. The places where he had lived or stayed were converted into museums devoted to him. Libraries, streets, farms, museums, towns, and whole regions were named after him, with the city of Petrograd being renamed "Leningrad" in 1924, and his birthplace of Simbirsk becoming Ulyanovsk. The Order of Lenin was established as one of the country's highest decorations. All of this was contrary to Lenin's own desires, and was publicly criticised by his widow.

Various biographers have stated that Lenin's writings were treated in a manner akin to holy scripture within the Soviet Union, while Pipes added that "his every opinion was cited to justify one policy or another and treated as gospel." Stalin systematised Leninism through a series of lectures at the Sverdlov University, which were then published as Questions of Leninism. Stalin also had much of the deceased leader's writings collated and stored in a secret archive in the Marx–Engels–Lenin Institute. Material such as Lenin's collection of books in Kraków was also collected from abroad for storage in the institute, often at great expense. During the Soviet era, these writings were strictly controlled and very few had access. All of Lenin's writings that proved useful to Stalin were published, but the others remained hidden, and knowledge of both Lenin's non-Russian ancestry and his noble status was suppressed. In particular, knowledge of his Jewish ancestry was suppressed until the 1980s, perhaps out of Soviet antisemitism, and so as not to undermine Stalin's Russification efforts, and perhaps so as not to provide fuel for anti-Soviet sentiment among international antisemites. After the discovery of Lenin's Jewish ancestry, this aspect was repeatedly emphasised by the Russian far-right, who claimed that his inherited Jewish genetics explained his desire to uproot traditional Russian society. Under Stalin's regime, Lenin was actively portrayed as a close friend of Stalin's who had supported Stalin's bid to be the next Soviet leader. During the Soviet era, five separate editions of Lenin's published works were published in Russian, the first beginning in 1920 and the last from 1958 to 1965; the fifth edition was described as "complete", but in reality had much omitted for political expediency.

After Stalin's death, Nikita Khrushchev became leader of the Soviet Union and began a process of de-Stalinisation, citing Lenin's writings, including those on Stalin, to legitimise this process. When Mikhail Gorbachev took power in 1985 and introduced the policies of glasnost and perestroika, he too cited these actions as a return to Lenin's principles. In late 1991, amid the dissolution of the Soviet Union, Russian President Boris Yeltsin ordered the Lenin archive be removed from Communist Party control and placed under the control of a state organ, the Russian Centre for the Preservation and Study of Documents of Recent History, at which it was revealed that over 6,000 of Lenin's writings had gone unpublished. These were declassified and made available for scholarly study. Since 1991, there has been some discussion about moving Lenin's body from the mausoleum to the Kremlin Wall Necropolis and burying it there. President Boris Yeltsin, with the support of the Russian Orthodox Church, intended to close the mausoleum and bury Lenin next to his mother, Maria Alexandrovna Ulyanova, at the Volkov Cemetery in St. Petersburg. His successor, Vladimir Putin, opposed this, stating that a reburial of Lenin would imply that generations of citizens had observed false values during seventy years of Soviet rule.

In Russia in 2012, a proposal from a deputy belonging to the Liberal Democratic Party of Russia, with the support of some members of the governing United Russia party, proposed the removal of Lenin monuments in Russia. The proposal was strongly opposed by the Communist Party of the Russian Federation and was never considered. Russia retained the vast majority of the 7,000 Lenin statues extant in 1991; as of 2022, there were approximately 6,000 monuments to Lenin in Russia.

In Ukraine, during the 2013–14 Euromaidan protests, Lenin statues were damaged or destroyed by protesters in various cities across the country, and in April 2015 the Ukrainian government ordered that all others be dismantled to comply with decommunisation laws. During the Russia's full-scale invasion of Ukraine in 2022, many of Lenin statues, which had been taken down by Ukrainian activists in the preceding years, were re-erected by Russian occupiers in Russian-controlled areas. These actions have less to do with communist propaganda and more with Lenin symbolizing Russia's domination over Ukraine.

In the international communist movement

According to Lenin biographer David Shub, writing in 1965, it was Lenin's ideas and example that "constitutes the basis of the Communist movement today." Socialist states following Lenin's ideas appeared in various parts of the world during the 20th century. Writing in 1972, the historian Marcel Liebman stated that "there is hardly any insurrectionary movement today, from Latin America to Angola, that does not lay claim to the heritage of Leninism."

After Lenin's death, Stalin's administration established an ideology known as Marxism–Leninism, a movement that came to be interpreted differently by various contending factions in the communist movement. After being forced into exile by Stalin's administration, Trotsky argued that Stalinism was a debasement of Leninism, which was dominated by bureaucratism and Stalin's own personal dictatorship. Marxism–Leninism was adapted to many of the 20th century's most prominent revolutionary movements, forming into variants such as Stalinism, Maoism, Juche, Ho Chi Minh Thought, and Castroism. Conversely, many later Western communists, such as Manuel Azcárate and Jean Ellenstein, who were involved in the Eurocommunist movement, expressed the view that Lenin and his ideas were irrelevant to their own objectives, thereby embracing a Marxist but not Marxist–Leninist perspective.

See also

 Foreign relations of the Soviet Union
 Lenin Peace Prize
 Lenin Prize
 Lenin's Testament
 Marxist–Leninist atheism
 National delimitation in the Soviet Union
 Old Bolsheviks
 Soviet Decree
 The Study of Vladimir Lenin's brain
 Tampere Lenin Museum
 Vladimir Lenin bibliography
 Ten Days That Shook the World

Notes

References

Footnotes

Bibliography

Further reading

 

 
 
 
 Wade, Rex A. "The Revolution at One Hundred: Issues and Trends in the English Language Historiography of the Russian Revolution of 1917." Journal of Modern Russian History and Historiography 9.1 (2016): 9–38.

External links

 Marx2Mao.orgLenin Internet Library
 
 
 
Newsreels about Vladimir Lenin // Net-Film Newsreels and Documentary Films Archive
Lenin: A Biography, official Soviet account of his life and work.
 Lenin's speech with subtitles
 Lenin Internet Archive Biography includes interviews with Lenin and essays on the leader
 
 
 
 
 Marxists.org Lenin Internet ArchiveExtensive compendium of writings, a biography, and many photographs
 

|-

|-

|-

|-

1870 births
1924 deaths
People from Ulyanovsk
People from Simbirsky Uyezd
 
Russian nobility
People from the Russian Empire of German descent
People from the Russian Empire of Swedish descent
People of Kalmyk descent
Russian people of German descent
Russian people of Swedish descent
Soviet people of Jewish descent
Russian Social Democratic Labour Party members
Old Bolsheviks
Heads of the Communist Party of the Soviet Union
Heads of government of the Soviet Union
Russian Constituent Assembly members
Leninism
19th-century atheists
20th-century atheists
Activist journalists
Anti-imperialism
Anti-monarchists
Anti-racism activists
Atheist philosophers
Comintern people
Communists from the Russian Empire
Critics of religions
Emigrants from the Russian Empire to Germany
Emigrants from the Russian Empire to Switzerland
Emigrants from the Russian Empire to the United Kingdom
Imperialism studies
Leaders who took power by coup
Marxist theorists
People of the 1905 Russian Revolution
People of the Russian Civil War
People of the Russian Revolution
Political activists from the Russian Empire
Political party founders
Political philosophers
Politicide perpetrators
Prisoners and detainees of Russia
Revolution theorists
Russian atheism activists
Russian atheist writers
Russian atheists
Russian communists
Russian economists
Russian Empire prisoners and detainees
Russian journalists
Russian lawyers
Russian Marxists
Russian people with disabilities
Russian philosophers
Russian revolutionaries
Russian shooting survivors
19th-century pseudonymous writers
20th-century pseudonymous writers
Saint Petersburg State University alumni
Infectious disease deaths in Russia
Burials at the Kremlin Wall Necropolis